Nicholas ΙΙΙ Zorzi or Giorgi was the Marquess of Bodonitsa, a member of the Zorzi family of the Republic of Venice, from 1416 to 1436, though the title was purely nominal by then. Before becoming marquess in an exchange with his nephew Nicholas II, he was the baron of Carystus (from 1410). He was a son of Guglielma Pallavicini and Marquess Nicholas I Zorzi.

He spent most of his adult career acting as a functionary of the Republic of Venice. He was an ambassador to the courts of Sigismund, Holy Roman Emperor and King of Hungary, and Murad II, the Ottoman sultan. He was poisoned, perhaps by Murad's men, in 1436.

His daughter, Chiara, married Nerio II of Athens.

Sources
 
Setton, Kenneth M. (general editor) A History of the Crusades: Volume III — The Fourteenth and Fifteenth Centuries. Harry W. Hazard, editor. University of Wisconsin Press: Madison, 1975.

1436 deaths
Christians of the Crusades
Marquesses of Bodonitsa
Ambassadors of the Republic of Venice
Year of birth unknown
15th-century Venetian people
Medieval Italian diplomats
Zorzi, Nicholas
Ambassadors to the Ottoman Empire
Lords of Karystos
Zorzi family
15th-century diplomats